The Philippine Navy Fighting Stingrays is the official men's volleyball team of the Philippine Navy. The team competes in the Spikers' Turf tournament and is composed of enlisted personnel and reinforced with civilian players.

Current roster 

Coaching staff
 Head coach: Cecil Cruzad
 Assistant coach: Rod Dimarucut

Team Staff
 Team Manager:
 Team Utility:

Medical Staff
 Team Physician:
 Physical Therapist:

Previous roster

Coaching staff
 Head coach: Edgardo Rusit
 Assistant coach: Rod Dimarucut

Team Staff
 Team Manager:
 Team Utility:

Medical Staff
 Team Physician:
 Physical Therapist:

Coaching staff
 Head Coach: Roberto "Bob" Malenab
 Assistant Coach: Rod Dimarucut

Team Staff
 Team Manager:
 Team Utility:

Medical Staff
 Team Physician:
 Physical Therapist:

Honors

Team

Individual

Team captains 
 John Paul Junio (2015)
 Alvin Cacayuran (2016)
 Milover Parcon (2018)
 Relan Taneo (2019)
 Gregorio Dolor (2022)

Coaches 
Rene Gaspillo (2015)
Edgardo Rusit (2016, 2019)
Bob Malenab (2018)
Cecil Cruzad (2022)

See also 
Philippine Navy – Iriga City Oragons

References 

Premier Volleyball League (Philippines)
Men's volleyball teams in the Philippines
Sports teams in Metro Manila
Military sports clubs in the Philippines